D. D. Dabke or Dattatraya Damodar Dabke was an actor in the first ever Indian full length silent film Raja Harishchandra, directed by Dadasaheb Phalke in 1913. He co-starred with Anna Salunke. He acted in three more movies Satyavadi Raja Harishchandra (1917), Lanka Dahan (1917), Shri Krishna Janma (1918) and later became a cinematographer, as well as a director. He directed the 1924 remake of Raja Harishchandra

References

Indian male silent film actors
20th-century Indian male actors
1885 births
1946 deaths
Male actors from British India